Red Lake (Howey Bay) Water Aerodrome  is located adjacent to the community of Red Lake, Ontario, Canada.

See also
 Red Lake Airport

References

Registered aerodromes in Kenora District
Seaplane bases in Ontario
Red Lake, Ontario